Daniel Miller Duchovny (known as Danny Ducovny; also credited as Daniel Duchovny) is a director of commercials. In 1990 he founded his production company, Cucoloris, with partner Linda Stewart. Before moving into directing commercials and the occasional TV series episode, he had worked on several movies in the camera department.

Daniel is the older brother of David Duchovny.

Filmography 
2008 - "Going Down and Out in Beverly Hills" (Californication episode)  — director
1999 - "The Unnatural" — guest appearance in this The X-Files episode, which was written and directed by his brother David
1994 - "You Make Me Want to Wear Dresses" (Red Shoe Diaries episode)  — director
1988 - Vibes — New York director of photography 
1987 - Tough Guys Don't Dance — additional photographer 
1986 - Jumpin' Jack Flash — second unit director of photography
1983 - Lillian Gish — first assistant camera 
1982 - The Weavers: Wasn't That a Time! — Cameraman 
1980 - Missing Persons — director of photography 
1980 - Fist of Fear, Touch of Death — camera operator 
1980 - We Are the Guinea Pigs — assistant camera and second unit camera operator

External links
 
 Cucoloris, his production company
 Liz Saunderson: Defining Ducovny, Boards (July 1, 2000)
 Relative Values: David Duchovny and Danny Ducovny, The Sunday Times (September 30, 2001)

Living people
Artists from New York City
American people of Polish-Jewish descent
American people of Ukrainian-Jewish descent
American television directors
Film directors from New York City
Year of birth missing (living people)